Benjamin Zé Ondo (born June 18, 1987) is a Gabonese international football player who is currently playing for Mosta F.C., based in Mosta, Malta.

Before Mosta, he last played for Wydad Casablanca of Morocco. He has also played in the Algerian Ligue Professionnelle 1 for club ES Sétif.

Club career
After signing for Algerian club ES Sétif in the summer of 2013, Zé Ondo had to wait until December to be qualified to play for the club. On December 28, 2013, he made his debut for the club as a starter against USM Alger in the 15th round of the 2013–14 Algerian Ligue Professionnelle 1.

Honours
ES Sétif
 CAF Champions League: 2014
 CAF Super Cup: 2015
 Algerian Ligue Professionnelle 1: 2014–15

References

External links
 
 

1987 births
Algerian Ligue Professionnelle 1 players
ES Sétif players
Gabon international footballers
Gabonese expatriate footballers
Gabonese footballers
Expatriate footballers in Algeria
US Bitam players
Living people
2015 Africa Cup of Nations players
2017 Africa Cup of Nations players
Gabonese expatriate sportspeople in Algeria
Association football defenders
Association football midfielders
21st-century Gabonese people